Henry Maddock (1836 – 30 September 1888) was a New Zealand cricketer. He played four first-class matches for Otago between 1863 and 1870.

See also
 List of Otago representative cricketers

References

External links
 

1836 births
1888 deaths
New Zealand cricketers
Otago cricketers